Fargues (Languedocien: Fargas) is a former commune in the Lot department in south-western France. On 1 January 2019, it was merged into the new commune Porte-du-Quercy.

Geography
The Séoune forms part of the commune's southern border.

See also
Communes of the Lot department

References

Former communes of Lot (department)